Trevor French (died 22 August 2012) was an Australian Paralympic swimmer.  At the 1964 Tokyo Paralympics, he won a silver medal in the Men's 25 m Freestyle Supine complete class 2 event.

References

Male Paralympic swimmers of Australia
Swimmers at the 1964 Summer Paralympics
Paralympic silver medalists for Australia
Wheelchair category Paralympic competitors
Medalists at the 1964 Summer Paralympics
Year of birth missing
2012 deaths
Paralympic medalists in swimming
Australian male freestyle swimmers